The Hollywood Music Festival was held at Leycett in an area called Hollywood on the grounds of Ted Askey's Lower (pig) Farm at Finney Green, between Silverdale and Leycett, near Newcastle-under-Lyme, Staffordshire, England, on 23 and 24 May 1970. It was notable for the first performance of Grateful Dead in the UK and also for the performance of Jose Feliciano and Mungo Jerry, and featured such notable bands as Free, Ginger Baker's Air Force, Colosseum, Family, Black Sabbath and Traffic. The company responsible for the festival was Onista Ltd, who promptly went bankrupt unable to pay festival staff. Onista was an offshoot of Eliot Cohen's Red Bus company, with Ellis Elias and Elliot Cohen as the promoters.

History
This was the first of the major festivals held in the summer of 1970 and part of the festival was to have been filmed by the BBC. Andrew Burgoyne of Burgoyne Film and Audio Services also filmed and recorded audio of some of the festival. Film crews can be seen on 8 mm footage of bands taken by fans at the festival on several occasions, notably during Quintessence and the Dead's performances. A DVD and CD set was issued in 2010, featuring archive material from the Grateful Dead's set, and one number each from Free, Family, Screaming Lord Sutch, and Radha Krishna Temple along with a biographical booklet of the event.

Rumours circulated in the music papers about the supergroup that Lord Sutch was supposed to be fronting, Eric Clapton, John Lennon, and others were supposed to join in a super jam, but none of these luminaries showed up, nor did scheduled acts such as the James Gang and The Flying Burrito Brothers which tended to dilute the overseas offerings. Former Tyrannosaurus Rex percussionist Steve Peregrin Took was billed to debut his new band Shagrat (featuring Larry Wallis on guitar) at the festival but this also fell through.  Shagrat would eventually play their first - and only - gig at the Phun City festival that July.

The festival has generally tended to be eclipsed by the larger, better known festivals of 1970 such as the Isle of Wight Festival and the Bath Festival of Blues and Progressive Music 1970.

Across the road from the festival site is Highway Farm, where the bands waited until they were required. In December 1970, Free released an album called Highway.

See also

List of historic rock festivals

References

External links
 Hollywood Music Festival History 
 Pre-festival publicity and hype
 Keele Oral History Project: The Hollywood Festival and Music at Keele
 BBC Stoke and Staffordshire: Hollywood Music Festival
 Stoke Gigs presents Hollywood Festival

Rock festivals in England
Music festivals in Staffordshire
1970 in England
Music festivals established in 1970
Heavy metal festivals in the United Kingdom
Jam band festivals
1970 music festivals